Francis Allen-Palenske (born 1976/1977) is an American elected official.

Biography
Allen-Palenske was born in Baton Rouge, Louisiana. Her parents operated various franchise food establishments. She graduated from Galena High School in Reno, Nevada and then earned a B.A. in Political Science and Business from the University of Nevada, Reno. She is of Korean descent. After school, she worked as a congressional staffer. She was elected as a member of the Nevada Assembly from 2004 to 2008, the first Asian-American woman elected to the Assembly. After her tenure, she owned and operated a Capriotti's sandwich franchise. She returned to public service after winning election to the Las Vegas City Council; she was sworn in on December 7, 2022 representing Ward 4.

Personal life
She is married to Steve Palenske, Fire Captain and 23-year veteran of the City of Las Vegas Fire Department. They have three children and reside in Northwest Las Vegas. She is bilingual, speaking both English and Korean.

Community involvement and achievements
Lone Mountain Little League, Board Member
Speedway Children's Charity, Board Member
Three Square; Donor
Grace in the Desert Episcopal Church; Donor, Usher, and Parishioner
2007 Outstanding Assemblywoman Award; Peace Officers Research Association of Nevada (PORAN)
Southern Nevada Burn Foundation; Donor
Mountain View Lutheran Elementary School; Parent volunteer
Doral Academy Fire Mesa, Parent volunteer
Capriotti's High Five-Award (outstanding sales); 2011, 2012, 2017, 2018, 2019
Girl Scouts of Southern Nevada; former Dinner chairperson, Fundraiser
University of Nevada, Reno Alumni Association
Summerlin Hospital Medical Center; former Advisory Board Member
Korean-American Women's Association of Las Vegas, member
National PTA
Nevada Republican Network Board Member
Clark County Republican Party Central Committee
National Rifle Association, member
Nevada Senior Coalition

References

Women state legislators in Nevada
University of Nevada, Reno alumni
Republican Party members of the Nevada Assembly
1970s births
Living people
21st-century American women
American women of Korean descent in politics
Asian conservatism in the United States
People from Baton Rouge, Louisiana
People from Reno, Nevada